From Hello Dolly to Goodbye Charlie is a 1964 album by Bobby Darin. The album was arranged and conducted by Richard Wess.

Reception

Music critic Richie Unterberger wrote in his Allmusic review "It's got the competent verve you'd expect from Darin's mid-'60s pop'n'swing vocals, though not so exceptional that you'd recommend it as the cream of the crop. The highlight, if only because it doesn't sound like more of the same, is the dramatic, somber ballad "The End of Never," with its unexpected melodic arches and Darin's committed singing."

Track listing

Side one
"Hello, Dolly!" (Jerry Herman) – 3:14
"Call Me Irresponsible" (Jimmy Van Heusen, Sammy Cahn) – 2:04
"The Days of Wine and Roses" (Henry Mancini, Johnny Mercer) – 2:34
"More (Theme From "Mondo Cane")" (Norman Newell, Nino Oliviero, Riz Ortolani) – 2:25
"The End of Never" (Bobby Darin, Francine Forest) – 2:39
"Charade" (Mancini, Mercer) – 1:46

Side two
"Once in a Lifetime (Only Once)" (Leslie Bricusse, Anthony Newley) – 2:06
"Sunday in New York" (Peter Nero, Carroll Coates) – 2:30
"Where Love Has Gone" (Van Heusen, Cahn) – 2:43
"Look At Me" (Darin, Randy Newman) – 1:50
"Goodbye, Charlie" (André Previn, Dory Langdon) – 2:22

Personnel

Bobby Darin – vocals
Lyle Ritz – bass guitar
Eugene DiNovi, Lou Levy – piano
Milt Norman – guitar
Jack Sperling – drums
Carlos Vidal – congas
Nicholas Martinez – bongos 
Julius Wechter – percussion, timpani
Bud Shank, Ronald Langinger, Plas Johnson, John Lowe, Bill Collette, Med Flory – saxophone
Conrad Gozzo, Virgil Evans, Tony Terran, Jimmy Zito, Shorty Sherock, Pete Candoli, Bud Brisbois, Al Porcino – trumpet
Dick Nash, James Henderson, Vernon Friley, Joe Howard, Milt Bernhart, Lew McCreary – trombone
Armand Kaproff, Eleanor Slatkin, Edgar Lustgarten, Raphael Kramer – cello
Jules Jacob, Ronald Langinger – flute
Jules Jacob – oboe
Joseph DiFiore, Alvin Dinkin, Harry Hymas, Alexander Nieman – viola
Jacob Krachmalnick, Stanley Plummer, Myron Sandier, Marshall Sosson, Lou Raderman, Harry Bluestone, Marvin Limonick, Henry Roth, Elliott Fisher, Arnold Blenick, Paul Shure, Bernard Kundell, Darrel Terwilliger, Alvin Dinkin – violin
Ann Stockton – harp
Eddie Brackett – engineer

References 

1964 albums
Bobby Darin albums
Capitol Records albums